Mauro "Lustri" Lustrinelli (born 26 February 1976) is a Swiss professional football coach and a former player. He is the current coach of FC Thun. He is also a former player of the Swiss national team. He has a Bachelor of Business Administration and wrote a thesis about the Italian Serie A.

Career
He started his professional career at the club AC Bellinzona in 1994 and played for them until 2001. Then he transferred to FC Wil and played there for the next three seasons before transferring to FC Thun in 2004. In 2005, he was the Swiss Super League's second highest goalscorer with 20 goals scored and also qualified with the club for the UEFA Champions League. In 2006, he signed for Sparta Prague but after one year at the club he returned to Switzerland and joined FC Luzern in order to play first team football leading up to UEFA EURO 2008 in Austria & Switzerland. After one season he returned 2008 to AC Bellinzona, where he started his career as a professional back in 1994.

International career
Lustrinelli made his debut for the Swiss national team on 17 August 2005 in a friendly match against Norway, having at that time won a total of six international caps for the team. He is also part of the Swiss team at the 2006 FIFA World Cup finals in Germany. On 19 June 2006, he was substituted in to play the last four minutes of the Swiss team's World Cup group match against Togo and after only one minute of playing he created the assist that allowed Tranquillo Barnetta to score the goal for the final 2–0 win for Switzerland, giving them a real chance of passing the group stage. The 2006 FIFA World Cup was his last appearance in the Swiss jersey. He was not selected for the UEFA Euro 2008.

Personal life
Lustrinelli is of Italian descent through his father, who is originally from Molise. Being originally from the northern part of Ticino (the Sopraceneri), Lustrinelli grew up close to the referee Massimo Busacca who represented Switzerland at the FIFA World Cup 2006. Within their close friends in Ticino, Lustrinelli and Massimo are known as "twin brothers."

In Ticino, the Canton where Lustrinelli is originally from, after the great game against Togo a fanatical "Lustrimania" exploded. In some places, this fanaticism was expressed with such intensity that students, so-called "Lustrini", were prohibited from wearing Lustrinelli's national team shirt to school.

References

External links

Official UEFA player page
AC Bellinzona profile 

1976 births
Living people
Swiss men's footballers
2006 FIFA World Cup players
Switzerland international footballers
Swiss people of Italian descent
FC Luzern players
AC Bellinzona players
FC Wil players
FC Thun players
BSC Young Boys players
Czech First League players
AC Sparta Prague players
Swiss Super League players
Swiss expatriate footballers
Expatriate footballers in the Czech Republic
People from Bellinzona
Swiss football managers
FC Thun managers
Association football forwards
Sportspeople from Ticino